Confederate Memorial Park is an Alabama State Park located in Mountain Creek, in rural Chilton County, Alabama, United States. Its address is 437 County Road 63, Marbury, Alabama 36051. It is sometimes found with the same address in Verbena, Alabama 36091.

Its centerpiece is Alabama's only state home for Confederate soldiers. It "operated from 1902–1939 as a haven for disabled or indigent veterans of the Confederate army, their wives, and widows." The last veteran died at the home in 1934, and the facility closed in 1939 when "the five remaining widows were moved to Montgomery for better care".

In 1964, during the Civil War Centennial, the Alabama State Legislature established Confederate Memorial Park, encompassing the original 102-acre site of the home, as "a shrine to the honor of Alabama's citizens of the Confederacy." In 1971, the site was placed under the authority of the Alabama Historical Commission.

History of the home
The home was founded in 1901 by former Confederate veteran Jefferson Manly Falkner, a lawyer from Montgomery, Alabama. He wished to provide a home for former Confederate veterans and their wives and widows who could no longer support themselves, even with pensions. Originally, the wives had to have their Confederate husbands alive and living at the homes, but in 1915 the rules were changed to permit widows. He donated  in 1902 for the purpose of housing such residents in Mountain Creek, a summer resort area. The state government took control of the operations at the home in 1903.  It was the only official home for Confederate veterans in Alabama.

The home included a small hospital, a dairy barn, mess hall, and nine cottages, with a then-modern sewage system. At its height between 1914 and 1918, 104 veterans and nineteen widows of such veterans lived at the home. A total of 650–800 individuals lived at the home at one time or another, most from Alabama, but some had lived in other states during the war, and came to Alabama after the war. The last veteran in the home died in 1934.  The home closed in October 1939, with the five widows left at the home moved south to a home in Montgomery, where they could receive better care.

The Mountain Creek Baptist Church first met at the Home in 1908, spending its first two years there.  Even though the church moved out, the earliest surviving church records show many of the Confederate veterans still going to the church in the 1920s.

The grounds include two cemeteries, with 313 graves.  A museum with relics from the war and the home is on the site.  Also at the site is a Methodist church; the former Mountain Creek Post Office was located there. The home's cemetery rosters, insurance papers, and superintendent reports are available at the Alabama Dept. of Archives and History in Montgomery.

Funding controversies

The property tax that funds the Confederate Widows' Pension Fund is required under the Alabama Constitution that was approved in 1901. Despite attempts to cut funding for a memorial some find offensive, this has protected the Confederate Memorial Park from budget cuts, unlike other parks and historical sites in the state. In April 2021, during the George Floyd protests, some state lawmakers proposed allocating the same amount of money to African-American historical sites.

See also
Alabama in the American Civil War
Confederate Memorial Park (Albany, Georgia)
Pewee Valley Confederate Cemetery — near the site of the Kentucky Confederate Home, in Oldham County, Kentucky

References

Footnotes

Sources
Reprint of the Building of Confederate Veteran's Home article from the Blount County News-Dispatch, April 17, 1902

External links

Alabama in the American Civil War
Buildings and structures in Chilton County, Alabama
Old soldiers' homes in the United States
Museums in Chilton County, Alabama
American Civil War museums in Alabama
Alabama State Historic Sites
Housing in Alabama